The John and Elizabeth McMurn Early House is a historic residence located south of Earlham, Iowa, United States. The Earlys settled in Madison County in 1855 from Eddyville, Iowa.  They bought  of raw prairie and established a farm.  This was the second house built on the property, and it was unusual for a "second generation" farm house in Central Iowa to be built of stone around the time of the Civil War. The Earlys were Presbyterians and held services in the house until a church was built.  John Early was an ardent Republican and abolitionist who was active in the Underground Railroad.  While "it is said, had as many as five runaway slaves on his place at one time", there is no evidence this house itself was a stop.  The Earlys lived here until their deaths in 1872 (Elizabeth) and 1873 (John).  The house was listed on the National Register of Historic Places in 1993.

References

Houses completed in 1865
Vernacular architecture in Iowa
Houses in Madison County, Iowa
National Register of Historic Places in Madison County, Iowa
Houses on the National Register of Historic Places in Iowa